En Fuga is a studio album from Puerto Rican singer Roy Brown. The album was released under Brown's label Discos Lara-Yarí in 1994.

Background

Most of the songs were written by Roy Brown, with the exception of "Fuga de música en vaivén" and "Poema de yin y yang". The first one was written in collaboration with Tato Santiago, while the second one is based on writings of Michael Blumenthal.

Track listing

Personnel

Musicians 
 Zoraida Santiago - vocals on "El profeta"
 Freddy Camacho
 Tato Santiago
 Toni Asencio
 Gonchi Sifre
 Nicky Aponte
 Cachete Maldonado
 Wichi Camacho
 Jerry Medina
 Edwin Colón Zayas
 Juancito Torres
 Angie Machado
 Rafi Torres
 Ángel Torres.

Notes 

1994 albums
Roy Brown (Puerto Rican musician) albums